Jean-Christophe Thomas (born 16 October 1964 in Châlons-sur-Marne) is a former French football player who came on for Rudi Voller in the 78th minute of Olympique de Marseille's 1–0 win over AC Milan in the Champions League final on 26 May 1993. He finished his career in 1998 with the team 'Saint-Étienne'.

Honours
Coupe Gambardella: 1983
UEFA Champions League: 1993

External links

1964 births
Living people
French footballers
FC Sochaux-Montbéliard players
Olympique de Marseille players
Stade Rennais F.C. players
AS Saint-Étienne players
Ligue 1 players
Association football midfielders
UEFA Champions League winning players
People from Châlons-en-Champagne
Sportspeople from Marne (department)
Footballers from Grand Est